Leon Yuriyovych Hladkovskyi (born 12 April 2002) is a Ukrainian professional footballer who plays as a centre-forward for Ukrainian Second League club Rubikon Kyiv.

References

External links
 
 

2002 births
Living people
Footballers from Kharkiv
Ukrainian footballers
Ukraine youth international footballers
Association football forwards
FC Dynamo Kyiv players
FC Vorskla Poltava players
FC Vovchansk players
FC Rubikon Kyiv players
Ukrainian Second League players
Ukrainian expatriate footballers
Expatriate footballers in Spain
Ukrainian expatriate sportspeople in Spain